Pollett River is a Canadian rural community in Westmorland County, New Brunswick.  The Community centres on the Intersection of Route 905 and the South end of Sanitorium Road.

Places of note
The Community is best known for the Annual Event called The Pollett River Run which is held the last weekend in April and involves creating home-made flotation devices and seeing how far they will go down the Pollett River.

History

Notable people

Bordering communities
The Glades, New Brunswick
Harrison Settlement, New Brunswick
Forest Hill, New Brunswick
Elgin, New Brunswick
Petitcodiac, New Brunswick
Anagance, New Brunswick

See also
List of communities in New Brunswick

References

Communities in Westmorland County, New Brunswick